Grande Vingtaine is one of the five vingtaines of St Peter Parish on the Channel Island of Jersey.

References

Grande Vingtaine
Grande Vingtaine